Robert Vernon, 1st Baron Lyveden  (23 February 1800 – 10 November 1873), known as Robert Vernon Smith until 1859, was a British Liberal Party politician.

Background and education
Vernon was the son of Robert Percy Smith, of 20 Savile Row, London, and of Cheam, Surrey, and the nephew of The Rev. Sydney Smith, Canon of St Paul's. His mother was Carolina Maria Vernon, daughter of Richard Vernon. Vernon was educated at Christ Church, Oxford (2nd class classics 1822).

Political career
He was elected Member of Parliament for Tralee in 1829, a seat he held until 1831, and then sat for Northampton from 1831 to 1859. When the Whigs came to power in 1830 under Lord Grey, Vernon was appointed a Lord of the Treasury (government whip), which he remained also when Lord Melbourne became Prime Minister in July 1834. The Whigs fell from office in November of that year, but returned already in April 1835, when Vernon was appointed Secretary of the Board of Control by Melbourne, which he remained until 1839. He then served as Under-Secretary of State for War and the Colonies from 1839 to 1841. The latter year he was also admitted to the Privy Council. He did not hold office again until February 1852, when he was made Secretary at War in the first administration of Lord John Russell. However, the government fell already the same month. When the Liberals (as the Whigs were now known) returned to office in 1855 under Lord Palmerston, Vernon was appointed President of the Board of Control, with a seat in the cabinet, a post he retained until the government fell in March 1858. The Indian Mutiny took place during his tenure. The following year he was raised to the peerage as Baron Lyveden, of Lyveden in the County of Northampton, and in 1879 he was appointed a Knight Grand Cross of the Order of the Bath (GCB).

In 1845 he was appointed one of the Lay Commissioners in Lunacy.

Family

Lord Lyveden married Lady Emma Mary Fitzpatrick, daughter and co-heir of the Earl of Upper Ossory, in 1823. In 1846 he assumed for his children by Royal licence the surname of Vernon in lieu of Smith and in 1859 he assumed for himself by Royal licence the same surname in lieu of Smith. Lord Lyveden died in November 1873, aged 73, and was succeeded in the barony by his son Fitzpatrick. Lord Lyveden was a member of the Reform Club, the Travellers Club, and Brooks's.

He tomb is located in the church of St Andrew in Brigstock, Northamptonshire.

Notes

References 
Kidd, Charles, Williamson, David (editors). Debrett's Peerage and Baronetage (1990 edition). New York: St Martin's Press, 1990,

External links 
 
 

Lyveden, Robert Vernon Smith, 1st Baron
Lyveden, Robert Vernon Smith, 1st Baron
Lyveden, Robert Vernon Smith, 1st Baron
Members of the Parliament of the United Kingdom for County Kerry constituencies (1801–1922)
Liberal Party (UK) MPs for English constituencies
UK MPs 1826–1830
UK MPs 1830–1831
UK MPs 1831–1832
UK MPs 1832–1835
UK MPs 1835–1837
UK MPs 1837–1841
UK MPs 1841–1847
UK MPs 1847–1852
UK MPs 1852–1857
UK MPs 1857–1859
UK MPs who were granted peerages
Members of the Privy Council of the United Kingdom
Knights Grand Cross of the Order of the Bath
Whig (British political party) MPs for Irish constituencies
Peers of the United Kingdom created by Queen Victoria
Commissioners in Lunacy
Presidents of the Board of Control